Tetrahydro-2-furoic acid is an organic compound with the formula HO2CC4H7O.  It is a colorless oil. Tetrahydro-2-furoic acid is a useful pharmaceutical intermediate relevant to the production of several drugs, including Terazosin for the treatment of prostate enlargement and hypertension.  or high boiling liquid,

Synthesis 
Furoic acid is reduced to tetrahydro-2-furoic acid, as originally reported in 1913 by Wienhaus. Tetrahydro-2-furoic acid has been prepared via selective hydrogenation of 2-furoic acid over a bimetallic catalyst of palladium-nickel supported on alumina.

Enantioselective heterogeneous hydrogenation of furoic acid to chiral tetrahydro-2-furoic acid proceeds in the presence of cinchonidine-modified alumina supported palladium catalyst in 95% yield and 32% enantiomeric excess. Similarly, homogeneous hydrogenation to chiral tetrahydro-2-furoic acid proceeds quantitatively with 24-27% enantiomeric excess in methanol solution employing a chiral, ferrocene-phosphine catalyst.

Applications

Pharmaceuticals

Reaction of tetrahydro-2-furoic acid with the hydrochloride salt of 3-[(4-amino-6,7-dimethoxy-2-quinazolinyl)methylamino]-propanenitrile provided alfuzosin, a drug for the treatment of benign prostatic hyperplasia (BPH).

A key intermediate to faropenem, an antibiotic for the treatment of acute bacterial sinusitis, chronic bronchitis and pneumonia has been prepared from tetrahydro-2-furoic acid via a process including chiral resolution and chlorination.

Tecadenoson is another example of a drug made using tetrahydro-2-furoic acid.

References 

Tetrahydrofurans
Carboxylic acids